Magazine is an album by the American indie rock group Jump, Little Children, released in 1998. It was the band's major label debut.

Critical reception
The Boston Herald thought that "from the three minute, three-chord sugar rush of 'My Guitar', to the cello-buoyed mope-rock of 'Cathedrals', Jump, Little Children comes off like pop-wise old pros."

AllMusic wrote that "there's an accent on swelling, instantly gracious choruses, but the band seems a bit too tentative in their new direction to infuse the songs with the self-belief necessary for the music to rise above American indie convention."

Track listing
All songs written by Jay Clifford, except where noted.
"Not Today" – 3:26				
"Violent Dreams" – 4:02			
"Come Out Clean" – 2:54			
"Cathedrals" – 3:55			
"All Those Days Are Gone" – 3:40			
"Body Parts" (Matthew Bivins) – 3:44				
"My Guitar" – 3:35			
"B-13" (Evan Bivins) – 3:49			
"Habit" (Matthew Bivins) – 4:52			
"Say Goodnight" – 4:31				
"Close Your Eyes" – 2:49

Personnel
Jump, Little Children
Evan Bivins – Drums, Guitar, Hammer Dulcimer, Percussion, Vocals
Matthew Bivins – Accordion, Composer, Electronic Mandolin, Guitar, Harmonica, Mandolin, Moog Bass, Vocals
Jonathan Gray – Bass, Vocals
Jay Clifford – Composer, Guitar, Guitar (Acoustic), Mellotron, Organ, Piano, String Arrangements, Toy Piano, Vocals
Ward Williams – Cello, Group Member, Guitar, Programming, Vocals
Brad Jones – Engineer, Mixing, Producer
Amanda Kapousouz – Musician
Jason Lehning – Assistant Engineer
Matt Martone – Engineer
Frank Ockenfels – Photography
Dee Dee Ramone – count-in vocals to "Come Out Clean"
Jim Rondinelli – Mixing
Lamar Sorrento – Cover Art
Leon Zervos – Mastering

Chart positions

References

1998 albums
Jump, Little Children albums
Atlantic Records albums